Orton may refer to:

Places

England
Orton, Eden, Cumbria, a village and civil parish
Orton, Carlisle, Cumbria, a parish
Orton, Northamptonshire, a village and civil parish
Orton, Peterborough, Cambridgeshire
Orton, Staffordshire, a hamlet

Elsewhere
Orton Cave, Ardery Island, Antarctica
Orton Island, Queensland, Australia
Orton, Alberta, Canada, a hamlet
Orton, Ontario, Canada, a small community
Orton, Moray, Scotland
Orton, West Virginia, United States, an unincorporated community
Orton Park,  Madison, Wisconsin, United States, a park on the National Register of Historic Places

People
Orton (surname)
Orton Chirwa (1919–1992), Malawian lawyer and politician, Malawi's Minister of Justice and Attorney General
Orton Grain (1863—1930), Canadian physician and politician

Other uses
Orton (photography), a photography technique
Orton Ceramic Foundation

See also 
Great Orton, Cumbria (near Carlisle)
Little Orton, Cumbria (near Carlisle)
Orton on the Hill, Leicestershire, England, a village
Orton Plantation, a plantation house on the US National Register of Historic Places
Oreton (disambiguation)